Saltese (also Packers Meadow or Silver City) is an unincorporated community in Mineral County, Montana, United States. It lies along Interstate 90 with access via exit 10. The St. Regis River flows to the north.

"Saltese is an old gold and silver mining town that took its name from a Nez Perce leader, Chief Saltese." "The town was first known as Silver City but was renamed in 1891." The post office opened in 1892.

In December 1912, David D. Bogart, the sixth mayor of Missoula, Montana, was killed in an avalanche in Saltese while prospecting for gold.

In 1996, a longtime establishment, the Old Montana Bar and Grille, was destroyed in a fire.

Demographics

References

Unincorporated communities in Mineral County, Montana
Unincorporated communities in Montana